Fridingen is a town in the district of Tuttlingen, in Baden-Württemberg, Germany. It is situated on the Danube, 10 km east of Tuttlingen, and 23 km west of Sigmaringen. A large hoard of Bronze Age jewellery (mostly armlets and bracelets) was discovered in the vicinity of the town in the nineteenth century. It is now part of the British Museum's prehistoric European collection.

Sons and daughters of the city 

 Josef Feger (1920–2010), mayor of Leutkirch im Allgäu
 Josef Hipp (1927–1959), athlete
 Paul Ackermann (born 1939), political scientist

References

Tuttlingen (district)
Württemberg